The 2013 GCC U-17 Championship took place in Qatar from September 3 - September 12. It was the 10th edition of the tournament.

Groups

Group stage

Group A

Group B

5th Place

Semi finals

Third place playoff

Final

References

GCC U-17 Championship
2013 in youth association football